Prosek or Prošek may refer to:

Places
 Prosek, North Macedonia, an archaeological site in North Macedonia
 Prosek, Niška Banja, a village in Serbia
 Prosek (Prague), a neighbourhood in Prague
 Prosek (Prague Metro), a Prague Metro station
 Stadion SK Prosek, a football stadium
 Prosecco (Trieste), a village in Italy, known as Prosek in Slovenian

People
 James Prosek (born 1975), American artist
 Lisa Scola Prosek (born 1958), American composer
 Bohumil Prošek (1931–2014), Czech ice hockey player
 Roman Prošek (born 1980), Czech ice hockey defenceman
 Václav Prošek (born 1993), Czech footballer

Other
 Prošek, a type of wine from Dalmatia